Martin Andrade Weber Chagas Carvalho or simply Martin Carvalho (born March 11, 1985 in Porto Alegre), is a former Brazilian striker.

Career
Martin Carvalho is son of Fernando Carvalho, former president of the Internacional.
After two seasons in Portugal, Martin decided ended his career and become a Football agent. He current plays in amateur leagues in Porto Alegre.

References

External links
 websoccerclub
 CBF
 zerozero.pt

1985 births
Footballers from Porto Alegre
Living people
Brazilian footballers
Sport Club Internacional players
Clube 15 de Novembro players
CR Vasco da Gama players
Brazilian people of German descent

Association football forwards